The Standard Emergency Warning Signal (SEWS) is a warning siren used in Australia to alert the public of danger. The siren is played over radio, television or public address systems in public places to warn of bushfire, flood, cyclone, tsunami, earthquake or terrorist attack.

Use

The SEWS tone has also been adopted for use in the new Emergency Alert Australia system which sends standard text messages from the phone number 0444 444 444 which has information about a potential emergency, and a phone call to landlines which starts with the SEWS tone with the words "Emergency! Emergency!" followed by a message regarding the threat and a phone number and/or website with more information. The National Alert System has been tested by the Country Fire Service in Kangaroo Island, South Australia and has also been tested by other agencies.

Origins
The SEWS was developed by the Bureau of Meteorology in the 1970s for tropical cyclone warnings. It was adopted as a national emergency warning signal on 21 May 1995.

References

External links
Emergency Alert Australia
Country Fire Authority SEWS system (Victoria)
Disaster Mitigation – the Bureau's Role at Australian Bureau of Meteorology
Sample of siren sound

Emergency management in Australia
Emergency population warning systems